Drewry Point Provincial Park is a provincial park in British Columbia, Canada, on the west side of Kootenay Lake, southeast of the city of Nelson.

References

Provincial parks of British Columbia
West Kootenay
1970 establishments in British Columbia
Protected areas established in 1970